Celebration is the fourth studio album by new age composer Deuter. It was released in 1978 on Kuckuck Schallplatten.

Track listing

Personnel
Adapted from the Haleakala liner notes.
 Deuter – flute, guitar,  synthesizer, production
 Manfred Manke – design
 Eckart Rahn – cover art

Release history

References

External links 
 

1978 albums
Deuter albums
Kuckuck Schallplatten albums